The 2008 Kazakhstan Premier League was the 17th season of the Kazakhstan Premier League, the highest football league competition in Kazakhstan, and took place between 8 March and 5 November.

Teams
For the 2007 season, Megasport and Energetik were promoted to the Premier League, replacing Taraz and Ekibastuzets, who had been thrown out of the league for Match fixing,

Team overview

Managerial changes

League table

Golden match
Because Aktobe and Tobol were tied on points and number of wins after the regular season, they played out the championship in a decision game.

Results

Season statistics

Top scorers

References

External links
 kff.kz 
 lyakhov.kz 
 soccerway.com
 uefa.com

Kazakhstan Premier League seasons
1
Kazakh
Kazakh